Cadence is a unisex given name derived from the English word cadence, which comes from Italian cadenza (a part of a piece of music, such as a concerto, that is very decorative and is played by a single musician). The meaning of this name is considered to be "rhythmic" or "flowing", but it can also mean "falling", since the Italian word cadenza derived from the Latin word cadere (meaning "to fall"). It has risen in popularity in the United States, where it ranked at No. 214 in popularity for baby girls in 2006, having jumped 745 places up the chart since 2002, when it was ranked at No. 959. It peaked in 2007, when it reached No. 199. It is No. 503 on babycenter for 2018 for boys.

People with the name
Cadence Weapon, a rap artist from Edmonton, Alberta, Canada

References 

 "Cadence Name". Unusual Baby Names

English given names
English-language feminine given names
English-language masculine given names
English unisex given names